60S ribosomal protein L6 is a protein that in humans is encoded by the RPL6 gene.

Ribosomes, the organelles that catalyze protein synthesis, consist of a small 40S subunit and a large 60S subunit. Together these subunits are composed of 4 RNA species and approximately 80 structurally distinct proteins. This gene encodes a ribosomal protein that is a component of the 60S subunit. The protein belongs to the L6E family of ribosomal proteins. It is located in the cytoplasm. The protein can bind specifically to domain C of the tax-responsive enhancer element of human T-cell leukemia virus type 1, and it has been suggested that the protein may participate in tax-mediated transactivation of transcription. As is typical for genes encoding ribosomal proteins, there are multiple processed pseudogenes of this gene dispersed through the genome. Two alternatively spliced transcript variants encoding the same protein have been found for this gene.

Interactions
RPL6 has been shown to interact with Basic fibroblast growth factor.

References

Further reading

Ribosomal proteins